Ronin is a 1998 American action thriller film directed by John Frankenheimer and written by John David Zeik and David Mamet, under the pseudonym Richard Weisz. It stars an ensemble cast consisting of Robert De Niro, Jean Reno, Natascha McElhone, Stellan Skarsgård, Sean Bean, and Jonathan Pryce. The film is about a team of former special operatives hired to steal a mysterious, heavily guarded briefcase while navigating a maze of shifting loyalties. The film was praised for its realistic car chases in Nice and Paris.

Frankenheimer signed to direct Zeik's screenplay, which Mamet rewrote to expand De Niro's role and develop plot details, in 1997. The film was photographed by Robert Fraisse in his native France from November 3, 1997, to March 3, 1998. Professional racing car drivers coordinated and performed the vehicle stunts, and Elia Cmiral scored the film, his first for a major studio.

Ronin premiered at the 1998 Venice Film Festival before its general release on September 25. Critics were generally positive about the film's action, casting, and technical aspects, while the plot attracted criticism. The film performed moderately well at the box office, grossing $70.7 million on a budget of $55 million. Ronin, Frankenheimer's last well-received feature film, was considered to be a return to form for the director. Film critic and historian Stephen Prince called the film Frankenheimer's "end-of-career masterpiece". The car chases, which were favorably compared with those in Bullitt and The French Connection, were included on several media outlets' lists as among the best depicted on film.

Plot 

At a bistro in Montmartre, IRA operative Deirdre meets with two Americans, Sam and Larry, and a Frenchman, Vincent. She takes them to a warehouse where the Englishman Spence and the German Gregor are waiting. Conversations between the men show that they are all ex-government agents or ex-military-turned-mercenary. Deirdre briefs them on their mission: to attack a heavily armed convoy and steal a large, metallic briefcase, which functions as the film's MacGuffin. Its contents are never revealed. The team's first task before the main mission is to acquire weapons; this turns into a setup. Although the team survives and they get the weapons, Spence is exposed as a fraud by Sam. He is dismissed by Deirdre and the others continue the mission. As the team prepares, Deirdre meets with her handler, Seamus O'Rourke, who tells her that the Russian mafia is bidding for the case and that the team must intervene before they get it. During a stakeout, Sam and Deirdre act on their mutual attraction.

Deirdre's team successfully ambushes the convoy at La Turbie and pursues the survivors to Nice. During the gunfight, Gregor steals the case and disappears. He negotiates selling it to the Russians, but his contact attempts to betray him. Gregor kills the contact, then has Mikhi — the Russian Mafioso in charge of the deal — agree to another meeting. The team tracks Gregor through one of Sam's old CIA contacts and corners him in the Arles Amphitheatre during his meeting with two of Mikhi's men. Sam chases Gregor; Gregor flees but is caught by Seamus. Deirdre and Vincent confront the two Russian thugs, causing a shootout. Sam arrives to help, killing one, but catches a ricochet from the other when Vincent knocks away the thug's gun in order to kill him. Seamus kills Larry and escapes with a reluctant Deirdre and the captured Gregor. Vincent takes Sam to a villa owned by his friend, Jean-Pierre. After removing the bullet and letting Sam recuperate, Vincent asks Jean-Pierre to help them find Gregor and the Irish operatives.

In Paris, Gregor is persuaded through violent interrogation to give the case back to Seamus and Deirdre. After retrieving it from a post office, they are pursued by Sam and Vincent in a high-speed chase. Vincent shoots out their tire, sending their car off an unfinished overpass. Gregor escapes with the case while road workers rescue Deirdre and Seamus from the burning vehicle. Unsure where to go next, Sam and Vincent decide to track down the Russians; one of Jean-Pierre's contacts tells them they are involved with figure-skater (and Mikhi's girlfriend) Natacha Kirilova, who is appearing at Le Zénith.

During Natacha's performance, Mikhi meets with Gregor, who says a sniper in the arena will shoot Natacha if Mikhi betrays him. Mikhi surprises Gregor by letting Natacha be killed before killing Gregor and taking the case. Amid the ensuing chaos from Natacha's shooting, Sam and Vincent leave the arena just in time to see Seamus kill Mikhi and steal the case. Sam and Vincent split up; Vincent pursues Seamus, but is wounded in a gunfight. Sam finds Deirdre waiting in a getaway car; he convinces her to leave after explaining that he is still an active government agent working undercover to get Seamus, not the case. As she drives away, Seamus is forced to return to the arena as Sam gives chase. Seamus ambushes Sam, but is shot dead by Vincent before Seamus can kill Sam.

Sam and Vincent have coffee in the bistro where they first met. A radio broadcast announces that a peace agreement between Sinn Féin and the British government has been reached, partially as a result of Seamus's death. Sam keeps glancing at the door as patrons enter, but Vincent convinces Sam that Deirdre will not be coming back. They shake hands and part ways; Sam drives off with his CIA contact as Vincent pays the bill and leaves.

Cast 

In addition, Féodor Atkine plays Mikhi, the Russian who is buying the case, while East German Olympic and World Champion figure skater Katarina Witt has an extended cameo as Natacha Kirilova, a Russian Olympic and World Champion figure skater.

Production 

In July 1997, Variety reported that Frankenheimer had signed to direct Ronin, making it his fifth picture for United Artists. Frankenheimer told the magazine he chose the project because it had a "very good script" and was "the kind of movie I'd love to go see ... What I like is, it's a character-driven action picture, and I have done those before, with Black Sunday and French Connection II. It's not one of these CGI pictures, it's a film about people. It's not bigger than life, which I don't relate to that much." He also saw it as an opportunity to apply his broad knowledge and understanding of France, especially Paris, in which he resided for many years. He added, "I would not have been able to do the film nearly as well anywhere else". His films The Train (1964), Grand Prix (1966), Impossible Object (1973), and French Connection II (1975) were shot in France.

Many of Ronins principal crew members had worked with Frankenheimer on television films; editor Tony Gibbs on George Wallace, set designer Michael Z. Hanan on George Wallace and The Burning Season (1994), and costume designer May Routh on Andersonville (1996). Frankenheimer chose French cinematographer Robert Fraisse to help him achieve the look and style he wanted for the film. Fraisse impressed Frankenheimer with his work on the police thriller Citizen X (1995), which persuaded the director Fraisse could handle the more-than-2,000 setups he planned for Ronin. Frank Mancuso Jr. served as the film's producer.

According to Frankenheimer, French authorities helped him circumvent a strict Paris ordinance that prohibited film productions from firing guns in the city. This was enacted because many civilians had been complaining about the gunfire noise produced by film shoots. Additional factors influenced the decision; officials' desire for an American action film like Ronin, few of which had been filmed there since the law was passed, to be filmed in Paris and the desire to boost France's reputation as a filming location.

Screenplay 
Writer John David Zeik, a newcomer to film, conceived the idea for Ronin after reading James Clavell's novel Shōgun at the age of 15. It gave him background information on rōnin (masterless samurai), which he incorporated into a screenplay years later. On choosing France as the story's key location, Zeik said: "Many years later in Nice, the location of one of the key set pieces of the story, I stared into the sun and saw the silhouettes of five heavily armed Gendarmes crossing the Promenade des Anglais. That image made me realize that I wanted to set the film in France."

Accounts differ as to the screenplay's authorship. According to Zeik's attorney, Playwright David Mamet was brought in shortly before production to expand De Niro's role and add a female love interest. Although Mamet rewrote several scenes, his contributions were minor according to Zeik's account. Frankenheimer said Mamet's contributions were more significant: "The credits should read: 'Story by J.D. Zeik, screenplay by David Mamet'. We didn't shoot a line of Zeik's script." Frankenheimer later retracted this in a September 1998 open letter published in Variety, writing that "J.D. Zeik is unequivocally entitled to the first position screenwriting credit as well as the sole story credit he was awarded by the WGA ... [He] deserves recognition for his significant contribution to this film, and I am proud to have worked with him". When he learned he would have to share credit with Zeik, Mamet insisted on being credited with the pseudonym Richard Weisz because he had earlier decided to attach his name only to projects for which he was the sole writer.

Filming and cinematography 

Ronin was produced on a budget of $55 million. Principal photography lasted 78 days, beginning on November 3, 1997, in an abandoned workshop at Aubervilliers. Scenes at Porte des Lilas and the historic Arles Amphitheatre were filmed that November; the crew then filmed at the Hotel Majestic in Cannes, La Turbie, and Villefranche. Production was suspended for Christmas on December 19 and resumed on January 5, 1998, at Épinay, where the crew built two interior sets on sound stages; one for the bistro in Montmartre and another for the rural farmhouse, both of which also have exterior location shots. The climactic scene with a panicked crowd at Le Zénith required about 2,000 extras, who were supervised by French casting director Margot Capelier. Filming concluded at La Défense on March 3, 1998.

Because there were no second unit director and camera operator to film the action scenes, Frankenheimer and cinematographer Robert Fraisse supervised them for an additional 30 days after the main unit finished filming. The first major car-chase scene was shot in La Turbie and Nice; the rest were filmed in areas of Paris including La Défense and the Pont du Garigliano. Scenes set in a road tunnel were filmed at night because it was impossible to block tunnel traffic during the day. The freeway chase, in which the actors dodge oncoming vehicles, was filmed in four hours on a closed road.

Frankenheimer's affinity for deep depth of field led him to shoot the film entirely with wide-angle lenses ranging in focal length from 18 to 35 mm using the Super 35 format, both of which allow more of the scene to be included in each shot. The director also avoided bright primary colors to preserve a first-generation-of-film quality. He advised the actors and extras not to wear bright colors and had the film processed with Deluxe's Color Contrast Enhancement (CCE), "a silver-retention method of processing film that deepens blacks, reduces color, and heightens the visible appearance of film grain". Fraisse said he used a variety of cameras, including Panaflexes for dialogue scenes and Arriflex 435s and 35-IIIs for the car chases, to facilitate Frankenheimer's demands. Steadicam, a camera stabilizer used for half of the shoot, was operated by the director's longtime collaborator David Crone. According to Frankenheimer, 2,200 shots were filmed.

Stunts 

Frankenheimer avoided using special effects in the car-chase scenes, previsualizing them with storyboards and used the same camera mounts as those used on Grand Prix. The actors had enrolled at a high-performance driving school before production began. According to Lagniez, the car-stunt coordinator, it was a priority not to cheat the speed by adjusting the frame rate; he said, "When you do, it affects the lighting. It is different at 20 frames than at 24 frames." However, Fraisse said: "Sometimes, but not very often, we did shoot at 22 frames per second, or 21." Point-of-view shots from cameras mounted below the cars' front fender were used to deliver a heightened sense of speed.

For the final chase scene, which used 300 stunt drivers, the production team bought four BMW 535is and five Peugeot 406s; one of each was cut in half and towed by a Mercedes-Benz 500 E while the actors were inside them. Right-hand drive versions of the cars were also purchased; a dummy steering wheel was installed on the left side while the stunt drivers drove the speeding vehicles. The final chase had very little music because Frankenheimer thought music and sound effects do not blend well. Sound engineer Mike Le Mare recorded all of the film's cars on a racetrack, mixing them later in post-production.

Frankenheimer refused to film the gunfights in slow motion, believing onscreen violence should be depicted in real time. Mick Gould, the film's technical advisor and a former instructor in the advanced training wings of the Special Air Service, trained the cast in weapons-handling and guerilla military tactics. The physical stunts were coordinated by Joe Dunne.

Alternative endings 
Frankenheimer filmed two additional versions of the film's ending. In the first, Deirdre (McElhone) waits on the stairs next to the bistro and considers joining Sam (De Niro) and Vincent (Reno). Deciding against it, she walks up the stairs. As she gets into her car, IRA men drag her into a van and call her a traitor; it is implied that she is later killed. Sam and Vincent, unaware of Deidre's abduction, finish their conversation and depart.  Although Frankenheimer said the test audience "hated" the ending because they did not want to see Deirdre die, he thought it "really worked". In the second ending, Deirdre walks to her car after Sam and Vincent leave the bistro; this ending was also rejected because it verged on being "too Hollywood", hinting at a sequel. Frankenheimer yielded to the test audience's response with a compromise ending; he said, "with the tremendous investment MGM/UA had in this movie, you have to kind of listen to the audience".

Music 
Jerry Goldsmith was originally commissioned to compose the score for Ronin but left the project. MGM executive vice-president for music Michael Sandoval assembled an A-list to replace Goldsmith. From Sandoval's three choices, Frankenheimer hired Czech composer Elia Cmíral, who said he "was far away from being even a 'B' composer at that time". Cmíral attended a private screening of the film's final version and considered its main theme, which at Frankenheimer's behest would incorporate qualities of "sadness, loneliness, and heroism". To achieve this, Cmíral performed with the duduk, an ancient, double-reed woodwind flute that originated in Armenia. Cmíral sent a demonstration to Frankenheimer, who "loved" it, and was signed as the film's composer. Cmíral's piece "Ronin Theme" was used for the opening scenes.

Cmíral's score for Ronin, his first for a major film studio, was recorded in seven weeks at CTS Studio in London. It was orchestrated and conducted by Nick Ingman, edited by Mike Flicker, and recorded and mixed by John Whynot. Varèse Sarabande released the soundtrack album on compact disc in September 1998. For AllMusic, Jason Ankeny rated the album 4.5 out of 5 and called it a "profoundly visceral listening experience, illustrating an expert grasp of pacing and atmosphere".

Release

Box office 
Ronin had its world premiere at the 1998 Venice Film Festival on September 12, before a wide release on September 25. Ronin fared moderately well at the box office; it was the second-highest-grossing film in the United States during its opening weekend, grossing $16.7 million behind the action-comedy Rush Hours $26.7 million, at 2,643 locations. The film dropped to fifth place on its second weekend and to seventh on its third, grossing $7.2 million and $4.7 million, respectively, at 2,487 locations. It dropped further until its sixth weekend, when it grossed $1.1 million (13th place) at 1,341 locations. The film ended its theatrical run with a gross of $41.6 million in the U.S. and Canada, and $70.7 million worldwide. Ronin was 1998's 11th-highest-grossing R-rated film.

Critical response 
Critical reception to Ronin was favorable; critics praised its ensemble cast, with many singling out Robert De Niro. Todd McCarthy in Variety credited De Niro with sustaining the film but a reviewer from the Chicago Reader disagreed. The film's action scenes, particularly the car chases, were generally praised; Janet Maslin in The New York Times called them "nothing short of sensational". These scenes were criticized by The Washington Post for their length and by McCarthy for their excessive jump cuts. Robert Fraisse's cinematography was routinely praised; Michael Wilmington in the Chicago Tribune called it superficially attractive and entertaining. Although the plot was criticized by the Chicago Reader as dull and The Washington Post as derivative, Wilmington called it a "familiar but taut tale". Some reviewers singled out the espionage scene in which De Niro and Natascha McElhone pose as tourists and photograph their targets at a Cannes hotel as one of the film's best.

Critics also evaluated Frankenheimer because the broad acclaim he received with the political thriller The Manchurian Candidate (1962) established him as a director. Many said he was influenced by the works of fellow filmmaker and close friend Jean-Pierre Melville, particularly Melville's neo-noir film Le Samouraï (1967), but McCarthy wrote that Ronin lacks Melville's "world-weary, existential ennui".  The film was considered to be a return to form for Frankenheimer, whose Emmy Awards for the television films Against the Wall (1994), The Burning Season, Andersonville and George Wallace had resurrected his career, after it lost momentum during the 1970s and 1980s due to the director's alcohol addiction. Ronin was Frankenheimer's last well-received feature film; Wilmington called it the director's best theatrical film in decades despite lacking The Manchurian Candidate "blazing invention", and Stephen Prince called the film his "end-of-career masterpiece". Prince wrote:

With Ronin, Frankenheimer vindicated his cinematic talents and aesthetic preferences. The film is stylistically bonded with the principles of his work as found in the earliest and best period of his career. Its aesthetic of realism places it with Grand Prix, The Train, and The Gypsy Moths, and its minimalist conception of character and narrative detail bonds it to those productions as well. Frankenheimer had not lost his touch as a filmmaker, far from it. Ronin is smart, sharp, and witty, and it shows a greater facility for visual storytelling than most films made today, by younger directors, can muster.

Post-release

Home media 
In February 1999, MGM Home Entertainment released Ronin as a two-disc DVD that contained versions in widescreen and pan and scan formats, and Dolby Digital 5.1 sound. The DVD also contains the alternative ending and an audio commentary by John Frankenheimer, who discusses the film's production history. MGM released a special edition DVD of the film in October 2004 and a two-disc collector's edition in May 2006, both of which have additional cast and crew interviews.

It was released on Blu-ray with its theatrical trailer in February 2009. In August 2017, Arrow Video released a special edition Blu-ray with a 4K resolution restoration from the original camera negative that was supervised and approved by cinematographer Robert Fraisse. Arrow's Blu-ray also includes archival bonus features that originally appeared on the MGM special edition DVD, together with Fraisse talking about his early cinematography career and his involvement with Ronin.

Cinematic analysis 

The film's title was derived from the Japanese legend of rōnin, samurai whose leader was killed and left them with no one to serve, and roamed the countryside as mercenaries and bandits to regain a sense of purpose. In Frankenheimer's film, the rōnin are former intelligence operatives who are unemployed at the end of the Cold War; devoid of purpose, they become highly-paid mercenaries. Michael Lonsdale's character elaborates on the analogy in an anecdote about the forty-seven rōnin told with miniatures, comparing the film's characters to the 18th-century rōnin of Japan. In his essay, "Action and Abstraction in Ronin", Stephen Prince wrote that the rōnin metaphor explores themes of "service, honor, and obligation to complex ways by showing that service may entail betrayal and that honor may be measured according to disparate terms". According to Stephen B. Armstrong, "Arguably Frankenheimer uses this story to highlight and contrast the moral and social weakness that characterize the band of rōnin in his film".

The film features a MacGuffin plot device in the form of a briefcase, the contents of which are important but unknown. Chicago Sun-Times critic Roger Ebert wrote that its content is identical to that of the equally-mysterious case in Quentin Tarantino's Pulp Fiction (1994), also a MacGuffin. Michael Wilmington of the Chicago Tribune called Ronin an homage to The French Connection (1971), The Parallax View (1974), and Three Days of the Condor (1975); thriller films known for their lack of visual effects. Maitland McDonagh of TV Guide also compared the film to The Day of the Jackal (1973) and noted similarities between Ronins opening scene and that of Tarantino's Reservoir Dogs (1992), in which a group of professional killers who have not met before assemble. According to Armstrong, the film's plot observes the conventions of heist films.

Frankenheimer employed a hyperrealistic aesthetic in his films "to make them look realer than real, because reality by itself can be very boring", and saw them as having a tinge of semi-documentary. He credited Gillo Pontecorvo's The Battle of Algiers (1966), a film he considered flawless and more influential than any other he had seen, with inspiring this style. According to Prince, "Frankenheimer's success at working in this realist style, avoiding special effects trickery, places the car chase in Ronin in the same rarefied class as the celebrated chase in Bullitt (1968)". The director credited the Russian film The Cranes Are Flying (1957) with inspiring invisible cuts in Ronin. On the film's DVD audio commentary, Frankenheimer notes a wipe during the opening scenes made by two extras walking across the frame, which becomes a tracking shot of Jean Reno entering the bistro. His intention for the cut was to conceal the fact that the bistro's interior was a set; its exterior was filmed on location.

Legacy

Modern reception 
 In 2019, Rotten Tomatoes' Alex Vo  ranked Ronin No. 101 on his list of the "140 Essential Action Movies To Watch Now". 

Ronin car chases were included on several media outlets' lists of the best depicted on film, including CNN (No. 2), Time (No. 12), Fandango (No. 6), Complex (No. 25), The Daily Telegraph (No. 10), PopMatters (No. 9), IGN (No. 9), Screen Rant (No. 8), Business Insider (No. 3), Consequence of Sound (No. 6), and Collider. Some critics have said the chase scenes in Mission: Impossible – Fallout (2018) were influenced by those in Ronin. Screen Rant ranked Ronin No. 1 on its list of the "12 Best Action Movies You've Never Heard Of". In 2014, Time Out polled several film critics, directors, actors, and stunt actors about their top action films; Ronin was 72nd on the list. Paste magazine ranked the film at No. 10 on its list of the "25 Best Movies of 1998". Ronin was included in the film reference book 101 Action Movies You Must See Before You Die.

Video games 
Ronin influenced the conception of the action video games Burnout and Alpha Protocol.

Footnotes

References

Bibliography

External links 

 
 
 

1998 action thriller films
1990s chase films
1990s heist films
1990s spy films
1998 films
American action thriller films
American chase films
American heist films
American spy films
1990s English-language films
Films about the Central Intelligence Agency
Films about the Irish Republican Army
Films about the Russian Mafia
Films directed by John Frankenheimer
Films scored by Elia Cmíral
Films set in France
Films set in Nice
Films set in Paris
Films shot in Paris
Films with screenplays by David Mamet
Metro-Goldwyn-Mayer films
United Artists films
Films about The Troubles (Northern Ireland)
Films about mercenaries
1990s American films